The Tribute Cornwall League 1 2011–12 was a full season of rugby union within Cornwall League 1.

Team Changes
Saltash as Champions, are promoted to the Tribute Cornwall/Devon League for season 2012–13. Helston will play against the runners–up from Tribute Devon 1 for a place in the Tribute Cornwall/Devon League.

Table

Points are awarded as follows:
 4 points for a win
 2 points for a draw
 0 points for a loss
 1 point for scoring four tries and/or losing a match by seven points or less

References

Cornwall
2012